Sussana Rebecca Dantjie (née Tsebe) is a South African politician who has been serving as the Speaker of the North West Provincial Legislature since May 2014. She was a Member of the National Assembly of South Africa from May 2009 to May 2014. Dantjie is a member of the African National Congress.

Political career 
Dantjie is a member of the African National Congress. She was elected to the National Assembly of South Africa in April 2009. On 6 May, she was sworn in as an MP. During her parliamentary tenure, she sat on both the Portfolio Committee on Communications and the Standing Committee on Auditor General.

Ahead of the May 2014 general election, Dantjie was placed 12th on the party's candidate list to the North West Provincial Legislature. She was elected and was sworn in as an MPL on 21 May. She was also elected as the speaker of the provincial legislature, replacing Supra Mahumapelo, who was elected the provincial premier. Jane Manganye was elected as her deputy.

Dantjie was re-elected to the provincial legislature in May 2019 and remained as speaker. Manganye was elected to Parliament. The provincial ANC selected Viola Motsumi as their candidate for deputy speaker, and she was elected on 22 May.

Personal life 
Dantjie is married to Lungile Dantjie.

References

External links
Biography at North West Provincial Legislature

Living people
Year of birth missing (living people)
Tswana people
Members of the North West Provincial Legislature
Women members of provincial legislatures of South Africa
Women legislative speakers
African National Congress politicians
People from North West (South African province)
Members of the National Assembly of South Africa
Women members of the National Assembly of South Africa
21st-century South African politicians
21st-century South African women politicians